The 2013 World Modern Pentathlon Championships was held in Kaohsiung, Taiwan from August 19 to August 28, 2013. The event includes pistol shooting, fencing, 200m swimming, show jumping and a 3 km run.

Medal summary

Men's events

Women's events

Mixed events

Medal table

See also
 List of sporting events in Taiwan
 Union Internationale de Pentathlon Moderne (UIPM)

References

 Results at Pentathlon.org (UIPM)

2013 in modern pentathlon
World Modern Pentathlon Championships
International sports competitions hosted by Taiwan
Modern pentathlon in Asia
Sport in Kaohsiung